Deacon John Moore (born June 23, 1941, New Orleans, Louisiana) better known as Deacon John, is a blues, rhythm and blues and rock and roll musician, singer, actor, and bandleader.  John Moore was given the name "Deacon" by one of his band members.  He did not like the name at first as he thought everyone would assume he was a gospel singer and never get gigs.  However, based upon his early reputation, and at the urging of a music promoter, he decided to keep it as has been "Deacon John" ever since.

Career
Moore grew up in New Orleans' 8th Ward. He plays guitar and is the brother of the Creole scholar Sybil Kein.

He was active on the New Orleans R&B scene since his teens, and became a session man on many hit recordings of the late 1950s and the 1960s, including those by Allen Toussaint, Irma Thomas, Lee Dorsey, Ernie K-Doe, and others.

His band The Ivories at New Orleans' Dew Drop Inn attracted an enthusiastic following, sometimes upstaging visiting national acts Moore was hired to open for. While highly regarded locally and by his fellow musicians, lack of hit records under his own name kept him from the national fame achieved by a number of his peers.

In 2000 Moore was inducted into the Louisiana Blues Hall of Fame.

He is featured in the documentary segment Going Back to New Orleans: The Deacon John Film and the concert CD, Deacon John's Jump Blues (2003).

 he remains a local favorite on the New Orleans music scene. On July 25, 2006 Moore became president of the local branch of the American Federation of Musicians.

On April 10, 2007, Moore's son Keith was shot and killed at the age of 42, in New Orleans. Keith was locally famous in New Orleans as ambient noise artist, Jambox Pyramid, and member of the punk band Manchild.  In addition, Keith co-founded the experimental music event Noizefest in 2005 with local producer Sir Stephen, as an alternative, modern addition to the Jazzfest festivities.

In January 2008, Deacon John was selected to close the Inauguration of Louisiana Governor Bobby Jindal by performing "God Bless America" with the 156th Army Band and a Navy fly-over of jets, and later headline the Governor's Inaugural Ball.

In 2008, in ceremonies and performance at the New Orleans Center for Creative Arts, Deacon John was inducted into The Louisiana Music Hall of Fame.

Acting career
Moore had his first taste of acting 1987 by appearing in the horror film Angel Heart. Moore did not appear on the big screen again until 2013 when he had a cameo in another horror film, 
The Last Exorcism Part II. Moore also guest starred in a few episodes of Treme during 2010.

Discography
1990 Singer of Song (Singer of Song)
1999 Live at the New Orleans Jazz & Heritage Festival 1994 (RedBone)
2003 Deacon John's Jump Blues (Vetter) CD & DVD

Filmography

References

External links

 Deacon John's Jump Blues
NAMM Oral History Interview with Deacon John Moore March 19, 2015 

1941 births
American bandleaders
American rock guitarists
American rock musicians
American rock singers
American blues guitarists
American male guitarists
American blues singers
Rhythm and blues musicians from New Orleans
Living people
Tambourine players
Singers from Louisiana
Guitarists from Louisiana
20th-century American guitarists
African-American guitarists
20th-century African-American male singers
21st-century African-American male singers